Nancy O'Malley was the District Attorney for Alameda County, California.

Biography 
O'Malley was appointed as DA for Alameda County in 2009 by the board of supervisors when her predecessor retired. She ran unopposed in 2010 and 2014. 

In November 2017, O'Malley investigated a high-profile shooting of a pregnant teenager by Fremont police officers. While investigating the case, she accepted a $10,000 contribution from the Fremont police union, which was the largest single contribution that she had at that point received from a police union. One of the police officers who shot the teenager was the president of the Fremont police union. She later cleared the Fremont police officers, including the union president, of any wrongdoing in the shooting. 

On June 13, 2019, just after the Toronto Raptors clinched the NBA title over the Golden State Warriors, Raptors President Masai Ujiri was  allegedly involved in an altercation with an Alameda County Sheriff. The Sheriff's office was expected to file reports with the District Attorney's office. If filed, O’Malley would decide whether to bring charges against Ujiri. The investigation ended on September 21. Following a private meeting on October 21, 2019, with Ujiri, his attorneys and Assistant District Attorney Terry Wiley, which was held at the Sheriff's Department, Assistant District Attorney Teresa Drenick  wrote in an email to The Toronto Star that the District Attorney's office would not be "taking any further action".

2018 District Attorney campaign 
In 2018, she faced a challenge from a progressive candidate, Oakland civil rights attorney Pamela Price, running on policy of police accountability. The race was notable for the large sums of money being spent. Law enforcement unions spent large sums on O'Malley's campaign and in opposition to Price.

End of tenure of office
O'Malley announced she would not seek a fourth term of office and would complete her term ending in the beginning of 2023.

References

External links
Alameda County District Attorney's Office

District attorneys in California
Living people
People from Alameda County, California
San Francisco Bay Area politicians
Year of birth missing (living people)